Marcus Poskitt (born 28 November 2000) is an Irish cricketer. He made his Twenty20 debut for North West Warriors in the 2018 Inter-Provincial Trophy on 6 July 2018. He made his List A debut for North West Warriors in the 2019 Inter-Provincial Cup on 23 May 2019.

References

External links
 

2000 births
Living people
Irish cricketers
Place of birth missing (living people)
North West Warriors cricketers